Styx: Hits from Yesterday and Today: Recorded Live is a compilation album containing songs by the band Styx. It was released in 2001. It takes four songs from Styx's previous studio album, Brave New World and two of the three studio tracks from Styx's previous live double album, Return to Paradise, and combines them with four live tracks from the previously released Arch Allies: Live at Riverport.

Track listing
 "Number One" (Tommy Shaw) - 4:35
 "Best New Face" (Jack Blades, T. Shaw) - 3:37
 "Edge of the Century" (Glen Burtnik, Bob Berger) - 4:59
 "Fooling Yourself (The Angry Young Man)" (T. Shaw) - 6:18
 "On My Way" (T. Shaw) - 5:01
 "Dear John" (T. Shaw) - 3:04
 "The Grand Illusion" (D. DeYoung) - 5:33
 "Too Much Time on My Hands" (T. Shaw) - 5:18
 "Brave New World" (T. Shaw, James "J.Y." Young) - 5:14 (Incorrectly credited on the album as "What Have They Done To You (T. Shaw, J. Young)
 "Everything Is Cool" (T. Shaw) - 7:49
 Bonus Video: "Renegade" (T. Shaw) - 14:27

Personnel
Tommy Shaw: vocals, guitar, mandolin
James "J.Y." Young: vocals, guitar, keyboards
Lawrence Gowan: vocals, keyboards 
Glen Burtnik: vocals, bass, guitar
Chuck Panozzo: bass 
Todd Sucherman: drums
Dennis DeYoung:  keyboards, vocals except for "Edge of the Century", "Fooling Yourself", "The Grand Illusion", "Too Much Time on My Hands", and "Renegade"

References

2001 live albums
2001 compilation albums
Styx (band) live albums
Styx (band) compilation albums